Symptoms of a Leveling Spirit is the fifth album by the Santa Cruz, California-based hardcore punk band Good Riddance, released July 10, 2001 through Fat Wreck Chords. It was their only release ever to chart, reaching #32 on Billboard'''s Independent Albums chart. It marked the debut of drummer Dave Wagenschutz with the band; their longtime drummer Sean Sellers had left in early 1999, and Lagwagon drummer Dave Raun had filled in on the 2000 EP The Phenomenon of Craving and on several tours until Wagenschutz, formerly of Kid Dynamite, joined Good Riddance full-time.

Like The Phenomenon of Craving and their previous album Operation Phoenix, Symptoms of a Leveling Spirit was recorded at The Blasting Room in Fort Collins, Colorado with the production team of Bill Stevenson, Stephen Egerton, and Jason Livermore. Singer Russ Rankin later reflected on the album as a high point for the band:

Symptoms of a Leveling Spirit, I think, was our...I think it was the pinnacle, it was definitely the pinnacle for us as far as our career if you just want to go by numbers. Like, the year that that came out, we were in every weekly, all of our shows were bumped up to the bigger rooms, we sold out our whole European tour, and that was about as good as it ever got for us and that was pretty cool for that to happen. Like that record was...I just have a lot of really good memories about that year personally and band-wise...everything just went really really well for us and we had a really successful year, and I still think that record, and to a lesser extent the E.P. that came before it, were where I finally kind of like, found my stride as a song-writer.

 Reception 
Reception to Symptoms of a Leveling Spirit'' was positive. Chris Moran of Punknews.org gave it four stars out of five, calling it "without question, the definitive GR album ... this is not the same 1,000-beats-a-minute GR you've listened to for the last several years." Jo-Ann Greene of Allmusic gave it four and a half stars out of five, saying that it "finds Good Riddance huddling ever closer to the melodic punk sound they've been moving towards over the few preceding years ... However, the increased tunefulness takes none of the bite out of Good Riddance's lyrics. And whether attacking individual imperfections or greater societal ills, the group's songwriting remains savagely on point. Always threatening greatness, the group have now produced a true classic."

Track listing

Personnel 
 Russ Rankin – vocals
 Luke Pabich – guitar
 Chuck Platt – bass guitar
 Dave Wagenschutz – drums
 Bill Stevenson – producer, recording and mix engineer
 Stephen Egerton – producer, recording and mix engineer
 Jason Livermore – producer, recording and mix engineer, mastering

References

External links 
Symptoms of a Leveling Spirit at Fat Wreck Chords

2001 albums
Good Riddance (band) albums
Fat Wreck Chords albums
Albums produced by Bill Stevenson (musician)